Howarth is a surname (the article includes a list of people with the name).

Howarth may also refer to:

 Howarth Glacier, in Antarctica
 Howarth of London, musical instrument manufacturers
 Howarth Bouis (born 1950), an American economist

See also

 Haworth (surname)
 Hayworth
 Howard
 Howorth
 Howarthia, a genus of butterfly
 Howarth–Dorodnitsyn transformation in fluid dynamics